Ann Walsh Bradley (born July 5, 1950) is a justice of the Wisconsin Supreme Court.  She was elected to the Supreme Court in 1995 and was re-elected in 2005 and 2015.  She previously served ten years as a Wisconsin circuit court judge in Marathon County, Wisconsin.

Biography

Justice Bradley was born in Richland Center, Wisconsin.  She earned her bachelor's degree in 1972 from Webster University in St. Louis, Missouri. She worked as a high school teacher at Aquinas High School in La Crosse, Wisconsin, before entering the University of Wisconsin Law School, where she earned a J.D. degree in 1976. Justice Bradley worked in private law practice until she was appointed judge of the Wisconsin Circuit Court in Marathon County in 1985.

Justice Bradley is an elected member of the American Law Institute, a former associate dean and faculty member of the Wisconsin Judicial College, a former chair of the Wisconsin Judicial Conference, a Democrat and a lecturer for the American Bar Association's Asia Law Initiative.

Wisconsin Supreme Court tenure 
Bradley was first elected to the Court in 1995, and re-elected in 2005 and 2015. Her current term expires July 31, 2025.

2011 Conflict with Justice Prosser 

On June 13, 2011, Bradley had a confrontation with Justice David Prosser Jr. which allegedly became violent. Prosser, Bradley, and all other justices besides Patrick Crooks were informally discussing the next day decision that would overturn Judge Sumi's ruling on the collective bargaining law in Bradley's office. There are different accounts as to what occurred. According to Bradley, the discussion became heated after Bradley asked Prosser to leave her office and said she was bothered by his disparaging comments towards Chief Justice Shirley Abrahamson. Prosser allegedly then put his hands around Bradley's throat in what was described as a choke hold. Prosser himself said that these reports will be proven to be false.

According to other anonymous sources, Bradley attacked Prosser. "She charged him with fists raised," the anonymous source said. Prosser "put his hands in a defensive posture," the anonymous source said. "He blocked her." In doing so, the anonymous source said, he made contact with Bradley's neck.  Justice Prosser denied he choked Bradley saying "Once there's a proper review of the matter and the facts surrounding it are made clear, the anonymous claims made to the media will be proven false."  Justice Bradley stated that Prosser had choked her: "The facts are that I was demanding that he get out of my office and he put his hands around my neck in anger in a chokehold." Neither Prosser nor Bradley faced criminal charges from the incident. The state Judicial Commission has told its special prosecutor not to pursue new avenues to forward its ethics case against Prosser.

2015 reelection campaign 
On April 7, 2015, Bradley was reelected to the Wisconsin Supreme Court, defeating Rock County Circuit Court Judge James P. Daley.

Electoral history

Wisconsin Circuit Court (1986, 1992)

| colspan="6" style="text-align:center;background-color: #e9e9e9;"| General Election, April 1, 1986

| colspan="6" style="text-align:center;background-color: #e9e9e9;"| General Election, April 7, 1992

Wisconsin Supreme Court (1995, 2005, 2015)

| colspan="6" style="text-align:center;background-color: #e9e9e9;"| Nonpartisan Primary, February 21, 1995 (top two)

| colspan="6" style="text-align:center;background-color: #e9e9e9;"| General Election, April 4, 1995

| colspan="6" style="text-align:center;background-color: #e9e9e9;"| General Election, April 5, 2005

| colspan="6" style="text-align:center;background-color: #e9e9e9;"| General Election, April 7, 2015

References

Further reading 
 Aquinas News, Aquinas High School, La Crosse, Wisconsin, September 1972, 'Six new teachers join staff', Carol First, class of 1974, pg. 12. Article about Ann Walsh joining the Aquinas High School faculty.
 Aquinas News, Aquinas High School, La Crosse, Wisconsin, May 1973, pg. 8, 'Resignations announced for four AHS teachers'. Ann Walsh returning to graduate school to study law at the University of Wisconsin–Madison in the fall.
 Aquin 1973, Aquinas High School, La Crosse, Wisconsin, two photos of Ann Walsh, pg. 63.

External links 
 Justice Ann Walsh Bradley biography on Wisconsin State Supreme Court
 The 118-page police dossier on the July 13 incident released in August 2011, a word-searchable 70-page version that only includes the interview reports, and 12 pages of the most relevant excerpt.

People from Richland Center, Wisconsin
1950 births
Living people
Wisconsin state court judges
Justices of the Wisconsin Supreme Court
Webster University alumni
University of Wisconsin Law School alumni
Wisconsin Democrats
20th-century American judges
21st-century American judges
20th-century American women judges
21st-century American women judges